Kevin McGrath (born 16 March 1946) is an Australian wrestler. He competed in the men's freestyle bantamweight at the 1964 Summer Olympics.

References

External links
 

1946 births
Living people
Australian male sport wrestlers
Olympic wrestlers of Australia
Wrestlers at the 1964 Summer Olympics
Place of birth missing (living people)
Commonwealth Games medallists in wrestling
Commonwealth Games silver medallists for Australia
Wrestlers at the 1966 British Empire and Commonwealth Games
20th-century Australian people
21st-century Australian people
Medallists at the 1966 British Empire and Commonwealth Games